The Battle of Ashdod may refer to one of the following battles:

 Fall of Ashdod in circa 635 BC
 Operation Pleshet in the 1948 Arab–Israeli War
 Capture of Ashdod during Operation Yoav in the 1948 Arab–Israeli War